The Nieuwe Kerk is a Dutch Baroque Protestant church in The Hague, located across from the modern city hall on the Spui. It was built in 1649 after the Great Church had become too small. Construction was completed in 1656.

History

The church was designed by the architect Peter Noorwits, who was assisted by the painter and architect Bartholomeus van Bassen. The church is considered a highlight of the early Protestant church architecture in the Netherlands. Like many churches of that time was the New Church, a central building. Unlike other central building, the church is no simple circular or multifaceted plan but there is a space of two octagonal sections which are connected by a slightly smaller proportion in which the pulpit was prepared. The Dutch Baroque architecture of the church shows elements of both Renaissance and Classicism. Two church bells by Coenraat Wegewaert in 1656 hang in their original bell-chairs, 100,2 cm and 81,5 cm in diameter. He also designed the clock.

The church has an organ built by the Dutch organ builder Johannes Duyschot (1645-1725) in 1702. The construction has left most of the pipework and the case. The organ was rebuilt in 1867 by one of the best organ builders of that time, the business of Christian Gottlieb Friedrich Witte. They adjusted the design of the organ to make it suitable for modern Romantic music.

Up until these canals in The Hague were filled in at the end of the 19th century, the church was accessed by boat or from the Wagenstraat on a square island between the Spui river, the St. Anthonisburgwal or Rotterdam Veerkade (the old trekschuit route to Rotterdam), the Stille Veerkade or Amsterdam Veerkade (the old trekschuit route to Amsterdam), and the Paviljoensgracht.

Concert hall
In the 20th century, acoustical adjustments were made to the interior in a modern face. In the thirties the church was notable as the most impressive building on the Spui, which was one of the streets in the Dutch game of Monopoly. The church was closed in 1969 after a long restoration and reopened as a concert hall.

Famous burials
The Nieuwe Kerk, or new church (first half 17th century), contains the tombs of the brothers De Witt and of the philosopher Spinoza. Spinoza's tomb is in the churchyard.

References

Baroque architecture in the Netherlands
Baroque church buildings
Buildings of the Dutch Golden Age
Churches in The Hague
Netherlandish Baroque art
Octagonal churches
Protestant churches in the Netherlands
Religious buildings and structures completed in 1656
Rijksmonuments in The Hague